The Health Protection (Coronavirus, International Travel) (England) Regulations 2020 (SI 2020/568) is a statutory instrument (SI) enacted on 4 July 2020 by the Secretary of State for Health and Social Care, Matt Hancock, in response to the COVID-19 pandemic. The regulations aimed to reduce the possibility of infection spreading from travellers from overseas. They imposed requirements on certain categories of travellers arriving in England from outside the Common Travel Area (which comprises all regions of the United Kingdom plus the Republic of Ireland, the Channel Islands and Isle of Man). Travellers falling within the regulations had to provide specified information to the British government on entry, and some had to undergo a fourteen-day period of self-isolation (later reduced to ten days).

As initially made, the requirements applied in respect of all travel to England from anywhere outside the Common Travel Area, but from 10 July 2020 travellers from a list of "exempt countries and territories"  were not subject to the requirement to self-isolate. Later amendments introduced further refinements including "additional measures" imposed on travellers from certain areas, and rules banning all flights and vessels from some high-risk regions.

The SI related to England only; there were separate regulations for travellers to Wales, Scotland and Northern Ireland.

On 17 May 2021 the regulations were revoked and replaced by The Health Protection (Coronavirus, International Travel and Operator Liability) (England) Regulations 2021. This article presents the legislation as at its date of revocation.

Regulations

Legal basis and commencement
The Health Protection (Coronavirus, International Travel) (England) Regulations 2020 (SI 2020/568) were introduced by way of a statutory instrument made by the Secretary of State for Health and Social Care, Matt Hancock, using emergency powers available to him under sections 45B, 45F(2) and 45P(2) of the Public Health (Control of Disease) Act 1984. The regulations came into effect on 8 June 2020.

Requirement to provide information
The regulations apply to most travellers who arrive in England from outside the Common Travel Area (CTA), i.e. all regions of the United Kingdom plus the Republic of Ireland, the Channel Islands and Isle of Man. Travellers must provide information about themselves and their intended address or addresses in England for the following 14 days. The same applies to travellers arriving from within the CTA who have been outside the CTA in the 14 days preceding their arrival.

The required information includes the passenger's personal data, journey details, and details of the place they intend to self-isolate. A passenger locator form must be completed on arrival into England, or, for passengers on the Eurotunnel Shuttle, at immigration control in Calais. Alternatively, passengers may complete the form in advance, as long as they provide proof of having done so if requested.

Members of diplomatic or consular missions, representatives of international organisations afforded privileges and immunities in the UK, diplomatic and consular couriers, government representatives on official business, and members of their households are exempted from the requirement to provide this information; although between 7 and 28 November this exemption was not available to any person who had been in Denmark in the 14 days before arriving in England.

By October 2020, the government concluded that the level of compliance with the requirement to provide information was "sub-optimal". The Health Protection (Coronavirus, Public Health Information for Passengers Travelling to England) (Amendment) Regulations 2020 (SI 2020/1090) placed additional requirements on travel operators to provide information to passengers, including a requirement to provide information relating to compliance with these requirements and health guidance. Such information is required to be provided to passengers within the period 24–48 hours before departure to England. From 1 February 2021, transport operators who do not ensure passengers they carry into England have completed the form can also be fined or prosecuted.

Requirement to self-isolate
SI 2020/568, as originally made, required all travellers who entered England from outside the Common Travel Area or who had been outside the Common Travel Area in the fourteen days prior to their arrival in England, to self-isolate from others for a period of time. Amendments to the regulations (see below) varied this general requirement in respect of certain countries.

Self-isolating travellers must travel directly to the place where they are to self-isolate and must remain there until the end of the 14th day after which they entered the Common Travel Area, or the date they leave England. From 14 December 2020 the self-isolation period was reduced to 10 days.

People who are within their periods of self-isolation may not leave or be outside the place where they are self-isolating except:
to travel to leave England, provided they do so directly
to seek medical assistance
to fulfil a legal obligation such as to attend court, satisfy bail conditions, or participate in legal proceedings
to avoid injury or illness or to escape a risk of harm
on compassionate grounds, such as attending certain funerals
to move to a different place of self-isolation
in exceptional circumstances, for example to obtain basic necessities such as food or medical supplies where these cannot be obtained in any other manner; to access critical public services; or to move to a different address when it becomes impractical to remain at the self-isolation address.

'Test to release', from 15 December 2020 
From 15 December 2020, amendments brought in by The Health Protection (Coronavirus, International Travel) (England) (Amendment) (No. 26) Regulations 2020 (SI 2020/1337) provide a 'test to release' regime which allows some self-isolation periods to be reduced from 10 days (previously 14 days) to five. The traveller must take a government-validated private COVID-19 test on or after the fifth day from last being in a non-exempt country, and must receive a negative result. The regime applies only to private tests, and a negative result from the NHS test does not count for this purpose. Anyone who receives a positive or an unclear result must continue to self-isolate. The regulations set out rules whereby private suppliers may have their tests officially validated for use under this regime. On 17 December 2020, further requirements were imposed on private providers of COVID-19 tests by The Health Protection (Coronavirus, Testing Requirements and Standards) (England) Regulations 2020. From 24 December 2020, Test to Release does not apply to countries which are subject to 'additional measures'.

Exempt countries, territories, and parts of countries and territories

On 10 July 2020 a list of exempt countries and territories was introduced. Travellers arriving in England who in the preceding 14 days have been in or transited only through a country or territory on the exempt list do not have to self-isolate.

The table below lists all the places which are or have been exempt (travellers from any place that is not listed in this table must self-isolate) or which have been subject to additional restrictions beyond the standard requirement to self-isolate. The colour-coding is based on the final legally-binding English regulations – ignoring government 'guidelines' and political statements, as enacted prior to the repeal of the rules on 17 May 2021. These are subject to a variety of exceptions, summarised below.

The list of countries with exemptions and additional restrictions was last amended by SI 2021/571, in force from 12 May 2021. Persons travelling from all countries listed in the table below ceased to be subject to these rules on the repeal of the regulations on 17 May 2021 but may be subject to restrictions under the newly created The Health Protection (Coronavirus, International Travel and Operator Liability) (England) Regulations 2021 from this date.

Travellers entering England from any place that is not listed in this table must self-isolate.

Transitional rules 
A passenger who arrives in the UK from a country which is later removed from the exemption list does not then need to self-isolate. A passenger who arrives in the UK from a country which later becomes exempt must still complete their 14-day self-isolation.

Exempt classes of traveller 
Certain classes of traveller, particularly those who need to cross the border for work purposes, are exempt from self-isolation or subject to modified requirements. These include, subject to a complex variety of conditions:
 transit passengers, and those travelling to receive healthcare
 people who cross the border at least weekly to travel between work and home
 seasonal farm workers
 healthcare professionals (until 30 July only)
 healthcare couriers, and those involved in clinical trials
 road haulage workers and road passenger transit workers
 mariners, air crew and tunnel workers
 essential government contractors, and other essential and emergency workers
 oil and gas, nuclear, aerospace and space workers
 postal operators
 repatriated prisoners, extradited persons, and their escorts

From 7 July 2020:
 elite sportspeople travelling for a specified sports event, and their support teams
 persons engaged in film or high end TV production (until 18 January 2021 only)

From 26 September 2020 to 18 January 2021:
 directors and actors engaged in audiovisual advertisement production

From 17 November 2020 to 9 January 2021:
 seasonal poultry workers who self-isolate at their accommodation or place of work

From 21 November 2020:
 Crown contractors, workers on essential state business, people facilitating diplomatic missions, certified emergency workers, subsea fibre optic cable workers

From 5 December 2020 to 18 January 2021:
 persons engaged in TV production, journalists and performing arts professionals. Also, certain senior executives who believe that their physical presence in England will, more likely than not, lead to the creation or saving of at least 50 jobs or a contract worth at least £100 million.

From 5 December 2020:
 newly signed elite athletes

From 19 December 2020
 persons carrying out work designated as essential by the Secretary of State for Transport, including the high speed 2 rail project.

Intended to be from 15 January 2021, but revoked before the exemption came into effect:
 workers dealing with flower bulbs and ornamental flowers
From 20 February 2021:

 Arrivals who are exempt from self-isolation for work/elite sports reasons must now self-isolate except when they are actually carrying out the relevant work/activity

Special rules for high risk countries 
Starting from 7 November 2020, additional stricter requirements were applied to passengers arriving from certain high-risk countries. These have variously been referred to as "additional measures", and "red list".

Denmark (7–28 November 2020) 
Following the Cluster 5 mutation of COVID-19 in Denmark in November 2020, special restrictions were applied to travel from that country. From 7 November 2020, all exemptions from completing the passenger locator form and from self-isolation ceased to apply to anyone arriving from Denmark, and a requirement to self-isolate for 14 days was extended to anyone in the same household as a traveller who had been in Denmark. A ban on entry to the UK on all travellers from Denmark (except hauliers and British citizens and residents) was also announced. From 8 November, passenger flights and vessels departing Denmark were banned from landing in England except in an emergency. An exemption was added on 14 November covering professional sportspeople and their support teams arriving in connection with certain football matches. On 28 November 2020, all of the additional Denmark-specific restrictions were revoked.

'Additional measures' (23 December 2020 – 15 February 2021) 
See table above for 'additional measures' countries and applicable date ranges.

From the end of December, more restrictive 'additional measures' started to be selectively applied to certain countries and regions. These additional measures required non-exempted arrivals who have been in or transited through any 'additional measures' country during the preceding 14 days, along with members of their households, to self-isolate for 10 days. The “Test to Release” option was not available for those people.

Hauliers who had been in Portugal only (including the Azores and Madeira), but not the other listed countries, are exempt.

Red list countries and hotel quarantine (from 15 February 2021) 
See table above for red list ('additional measures') countries and applicable date ranges.

On 15 February 2021 the 'additional measures' rules were significantly tightened, and the list of 'additional measures' countries became known as the 'red list'. From that date, non-exempted international travellers who have been in or transited through any red list country during the preceding 10 days are permitted to enter England only via one of the approved airports, namely Heathrow, Gatwick, London City, Birmingham and Farnborough, Bristol (from 24 April 2021), or via any military airfield or port In accordance with the previous rules, the traveller must on arrival be in possession of a notification of a negative COVID-19 test result, and must now also be in possession of (a) a booking for approved quarantine accommodation, (b) a booking for approved transport to that accommodation, and (c) a 'testing package' comprising bookings for COVID-19 tests at day 2 and day 8 after arrival. Certain 'reasonable excuses' for non-compliance are accepted, including disability, urgent medical treatment and lack of access to booking facilities in the departure and transit countries.

At the quarantine accommodation, the traveller must isolate for at least 10 days, and must undergo the day 2 and day 8 tests in good time, although replacement tests are allowed for with 'reasonable excuse'. If either is missed or does not return negative results, the quarantine period is extended. The tests may be undertaken either by a private provider or (for an official fee) by a public provider.

Travellers who are required to isolate may do so together with anyone with whom they were travelling. They may not leave the designated accommodation except:

 to travel directly to a port to leave the Common Travel Area
 to fulfil a legal obligation
 to take exercise
 to visit a dying person or attend a funeral
 in other exceptional circumstances such as medical assistance, to access critical public services, to escape risk of harm 
 to access urgent veterinary services.

Leaving for the purpose of exercise, to visit a dying person or attend a funeral requires prior permission from an authorised person, and may be subject to conditions imposed by that person.

Police officers and other officially authorised persons are empowered to enforce the regulations to direct the traveller to travel to and remain in the accommodation, to remove the traveller to the accommodation, to require the production of papers, to detain for up to three hours, to carry out personal (non-intimate) searches of the person and baggage, and to seize articles found.

Police officers are also given the power to enter premises to search for persons suspected of illegally avoiding isolation, and to remove them (using force if necessary) to their designated accommodation.

Arrivals banned 
All flights and vessels arriving in England from certain high-risk areas have been halted at various times, the first instance being the banning of flights from Denmark between 7 and 28 November 2020.

From 24 December 2020:

Direct passenger flights from South Africa are banned. Exemptions apply to UK government planes or vessels, emergency landings, and air ambulances.

From 15 January 2021:

Direct passenger flights from Argentina, Brazil, Cape Verde, Chile, and Portugal are banned, as are ferries or other passenger vessels arriving from Portugal. Exemptions apply to UK government planes or vessels, emergency landings or moorings, and air ambulances.

Requirement for negative coronavirus test 
The Regulations were amended with effect from 15 January 2021 by SI 2021/38. From that date, a passenger arriving in England from outside the Common Travel Area has to possess a notification of a negative COVID-19 test from a sample taken no more than three days before they departed for the UK, unless exempt. NHS tests are not accepted.

Exemptions apply to:
Children aged under 11 
Those in certain professions: 
Border and customs officials
Channel Tunnel system workers
Hauliers
Air, maritime, and rail crew
Civil aviation inspectors
Travellers transporting human cells or blood products
Seamen and masters, inspectors, and surveyors of ships
Travellers returning from conducting essential state business or essential, emergency, or policing work outside the UK and having a certificate of exemption from their department
Foreign diplomats or government officials travelling on official business and holding exemption certificates from the Foreign Commonwealth and Development Office 
Workers with certain specialist technical skills 

Test certificates may be presented physically or electronically, and must be in English, French, or Spanish. Test devices used to conduct the tests must have sensitivity of at least 80% (that is, a false positive rate of no more than 20%), specificity of at least 97% (a false negative rate of no more than 3%), and a limit of detection of less than or equal to 100,000 SARS-CoV-2 copies per millilitre.

Travellers may also have a reasonable excuse not to possess a negative COVID-19 test if one of the following applies:
The traveller was medically unfit to undergo a test and possesses a medical certificate to that effect
It was not reasonably practicable for the traveller to obtain a test owing to a disability
The traveller required medical treatment with such urgency that obtaining a test was not reasonably practicable
The traveller contracted coronavirus and required emergency medical treatment
The traveller was accompanying a traveller requiring emergency treatment and obtaining a test was not reasonably practicable
The traveller originated in a country or territory where tests are not available or it was not reasonably practicable to obtain one there or at any transfer point
The traveller's journey to their last departure point to England took so long that it was not reasonably practicable to obtain a test in the three days prior to departure, nor at any transfer point.

Tests after arrival
From 15 February 2021, travellers aged 5 and up arriving in England from outside the Common Travel Area, or arriving having been outside the Common Travel Area in the preceding 10 days, are required to purchase a testing package, consisting of a day 2 test and a day 8 test. The day 2 test must be taken on or before the second full day after arriving in England, and the day 8 test must be taken on or after the eighth full day after arriving. Unless the traveller is in a 'managed self-isolation facilit'y (government-approved accommodation), they may use the "test to release" option as before. If a test is missed, the self-isolation period is extended from 10 days to 14. A positive test results in the traveller and anyone else self-isolating with them being required to self-isolate for 10 days from the date of the test, and they become prohibited from leaving the country for that time. If the day 2 and day 8 tests are both negative, the traveller may leave self-isolation after completing the 10 full days, or when they receive the negative day 8 result if that is later.

Offences and enforcement
The regulations create the new offences of:
 Failing to complete the passenger locator form
 Failing to self-isolate as required
 Failing to comply with an authorised person's direction 
 Providing false or misleading passenger information
 Obstructing a person carrying out a function under the regulations.

Enforcement of the regulations is in the hands of the police and immigration officers. Breaches of the regulations attract a fixed penalty notice. Breaches relating to self-isolation initially attracted a fixed penalty of £1,000, later increased to an amount on sliding scale between £1000 and £10,000. Breaches relating to the provision of information attract a penalty of £100 for the first offence, increasing on a sliding scale to £3,200; with effect from 18 January 2021 this was increased to £500 to £4,000. Offenders may alternatively face prosecution.

From 15 January 2021:
Failing to provide a clear COVID-19 test on arrival in the UK
From 1 February 2021:
Transport operator failing to verify passengers' locator forms or COVID-19 test certificates
From 15 February 2021:

 Breaches of the mandatory hotel quarantine rules. Wilful obstruction of anyone carrying out the regulations: fixed penalties of between £5000 and £10,000.

Review and expiry
The regulations must be reviewed every 28 days (originally 21). Unless revoked earlier, they will expire on 7 June 2021.

List of amendments by date
The Regulations have been amended numerous times. The first amendment, the Health Protection (Coronavirus, International Travel) (England) (Amendment) Regulations 2020 (SI 2020/691), introduced the list of exempt countries and territories with effect from 10 July.

External matters

Enforcement in practice 
Although the police were from the first empowered to enforce the regulations, the Commissioner of the Metropolitan Police Cressida Dick stated on 14 May 2020 that officers in her force would not do so. As of 14 August 2020, nine fixed penalty notices had been issued at the border for failure or refusal to complete the passenger locator form.

Notice of changes to the exempt countries 
Many removals of countries from the exempt list took effect only at very short notice. When the Amendment (No. 8) Regulations (SI 2020/866) were announced late on Thursday 13 August to take effect from 04:00 British Summer Time on Saturday 15 August, a substantial number of British holidaymakers then in France were faced with the choice of rushing back to the UK on Friday or serving a 14-day self-isolation. The rush generated substantial demand for cross-Channel ferry crossings, Eurotunnel and Eurostar services, and even private jets.

Challenge to the regulations 
In September 2020, an English-resident property developer, his wife, and their two sons, who had been on holiday in Croatia took sought judicial review of the decisions of the Secretary of State for Health and Social Care and the Secretary of State for Transport, claiming that the Health Protection (Coronavirus, International Travel) (England) Regulations 2020 and the Health Protection (Coronavirus, International Travel) (England) (Amendment) (No. 10) Regulations 2020 were unlawful.

See also
The Health Protection (Coronavirus, Restrictions) (No. 2) (England) Regulations 2020

Citations

References

External links
The Health Protection (Coronavirus, International Travel) (England) Regulations 2020 (as originally made)
The Health Protection (Coronavirus, International Travel) (England) Regulations 2020 (as amended)
Guidance: jobs that qualify for travel exemptions – 22 May 2020, frequently updated

Statutory Instruments of the United Kingdom
2020 in England
COVID-19 pandemic in England
Public health in the United Kingdom
2020 in British law
Law associated with the COVID-19 pandemic in the United Kingdom